Elizabeth Kapuʻuwailani Lindsey is an actor, filmmaker and anthropologist. As an anthropologist, she works "to find, preserve and share the knowledge and traditions of indigenous populations before they disappear." She is also the first female National Geographic fellow and the first Polynesian explorer at the National Geographic Society.

Her work recognizes Pius "Mau" Piailug (Mau Piailug) of Micronesia, her mentor with whom she studied ethnonavigation.

Filmmaker
Lindsey directed and produced Then There Were None, a 1996 documentary film that chronicles the plight of native Hawaiians. It received the CINE Golden Eagle Award.

Actor
Lindsey has also worked as an actor, with roles in Star Trek: The Next Generation, The Byrds of Paradise, Magnum, P.I., and a number of other television shows and movies.

Awards and recognition 
 Miss Hawaii (1978)
 CINE Golden Eagle Award (1996) (for Then There Were None)
 "Woman of the Year" for The Big Island of Hawai'i (2004)
 National Geographic Fellow (2008)
 United Nations Visionary Award (2010)

Personal life 
Lindsey was married to John W. A. "Doc" Buyers, former chairman and chief executive officer of C. Brewer & Co., from 1999 until his death in 2006.

Lindsey married George D. Crowley, III in 2018.

References

External links
 
 
 

1950s births
Living people
American filmmakers
Miss America 1979 delegates
People from Hawaii
20th-century American people